Desperately Seeking Something is a British television series first broadcast on 6 November 1995, presented by travel writer and presenter Pete McCarthy. In it, McCarthy looked at various spiritual practices from across the globe, looking at both long standing traditional beliefs as well as 'alternate' religions which began to flourish in the 1990s. He met a variety of practitioners and participated in their rituals. It ran for three series, with the first two series focusing on practitioners located in the British Isles. The second season looked more at Christian and Pagan sects, including the Fellowship of Isis and the Golden Dawn. The third series saw him looking at world traditional beliefs like Australian Aboriginal beliefs and Hawaiian religion.

Before going on what would be referred to as a "spiritual journey", McCarthy said "I've taken on the role of everyman, I'm like lots of people who have given up religion and never replaced it with anything else."

Episodes
A complete list of episodes. All episodes were written and presented by Pete McCarthy, and directed by Steve Connelly. All three series were produced by Kudos Film and Television.

Series 1: 1995

Series 2: 1996

Series 3: 1998

See also
 Pete McCarthy

References

External links
 BFI entry
 Kudos Film and Television
 Desperately Seeking Something episodes - YouTube Channel: Six-String Steve

Channel 4 original programming
1995 British television series debuts
1998 British television series endings